Trifurcula saccharella is a moth of the family Nepticulidae. It is found in Ohio, United States.

The wingspan is about 4 mm. Mined leaves may be collected in early July and late August; sometimes the larvae of a third generation are found in October. Moths from the overwintering pupae emerge in May and June.

The larvae feed on Acer saccharum and Acer rubrum. They mine the leaves of their host plant. The mine is long and serpentine, in which the loosened epidermis is pale green and a black line of frass extends through the middle. The larvae are pale green and the cocoon is ocherous, regularly oval, much flattened and smooth, with a projecting rim extending entirely around it.

External links
Nepticulidae of North America

Nepticulidae
Moths of North America
Moths described in 1912